Sutton Salt Lake  in Otago, is New Zealand's only inland salt water lake.  It is located 10 kilometres west of Sutton, in the Strath Taieri.

The lake is filled only by rainwater and dries up during periods of warm weather and little rain. When full, the lake has salinity about one quarter to one third of that of seawater. The salinity is due to marine aerosols in rainwater which is concentrated by around 20000 evaporation and refilling cycles.

Sutton Salt Lake is also unique in that it lies in a region of windy cool-temperate maritime climate. This makes it different from most of the world's saline lakes, which usually form in arid continental landscapes. The total area of the lake, when the shallow depression is filled with rainwater, is nearly two hectares. The nearest coast is 50 kilometers from the lake.

The area around Sutton Lake gets 500 mm of rainfall annually. Coastal hills create a minor barrier to the rain, halving the amount of rainfall that the lake receives. Strong winds increase the lake's surface evaporation rate, which is around 700 mm/year.

References

Lakes of Otago
Saline lakes of Oceania
Endorheic lakes of Oceania